April L. Sykes (born July 30, 1990) is an American professional basketball player most recently with the Los Angeles Sparks of the Women's National Basketball Association.

Rutgers statistics
Source

USA Basketball
Sykes was selected to represent the U.S. at the 2011 Pan American Games held in Guadalajara, Mexico. The USA team lost their first two games in close contests, losing to Argentina 58–55 and Puerto Rico 75–70. The team rebounded to win their games against Mexico and Jamaica, but the 2–2 overall record left them in seventh place. Sykes averaged 9.0 points per game.

References

1990 births
Living people
American women's basketball players
Basketball players at the 2011 Pan American Games
Basketball players from Mississippi
Los Angeles Sparks draft picks
Los Angeles Sparks players
McDonald's High School All-Americans
Pan American Games competitors for the United States
Parade High School All-Americans (girls' basketball)
Rutgers Scarlet Knights women's basketball players
Shooting guards
Small forwards
Sportspeople from Starkville, Mississippi